Lycaonian is an unclassified language spoken in the former region of Lycaonia. The Lycaonians appear to have retained a distinct nationality in the time of Strabo, but their ethnical affiliations are unknown. The mention of the Lycaonian language in the Acts of the Apostles shows that the native language was spoken by the common people of Lystra around 50 AD.

The name "Lycaonia" is believed to be a Greek-adapted version (influenced by the Greek masculine name Lycaon) of an original Lukkawanna, which would mean 'the land of the Lukka people' in an old Anatolian language related to Hittite.

It is notable though that in the Acts of the Apostles, Barnabas was called 'Zeus', and Paul was thought to be Hermes by the Lycaonians, which leads some other researchers to believe the Lycaonian language was actually a Greek dialect.

References

Languages of ancient Anatolia
Languages extinct in the 1st century
Unclassified languages of Asia
Unclassified Indo-European languages
Unattested languages of Asia